10 Haters is the debut studio album by American hip hop duo Flash Bang Grenada. It was released on Hellfyre Club on August 23, 2011.

Background
The albums includes guest appearances from Open Mike Eagle and Del the Funky Homosapien, as well as productions from the likes of Dibiase, Nosaj Thing, Mexicans with Guns, Shlohmo, and Blocade.

Critical reception

Brett Uddenberg of URB gave the album 3.5 stars out of 5, describing it as "a showcase of two of the west coast's wittier spitters stepping into a vocal booth and polishing their collective smirk into some bizarre gems." Jeff Weiss of Los Angeles Times called it "a smart, subversive swag-rap record."

It was included on Pitchforks year-end "Overlooked Mixtapes" list, as well as Alarms "50 Unheralded Albums from 2011" list.

Track listing

References

Further reading

External links
 
 

2011 debut albums
Flash Bang Grenada albums
Albums produced by Dibiase
Albums produced by Mono/Poly